Shin-Ming Tan (譚信民), also known as Hsin-Min Tan was born on June 16, 1950, in Chiayi County Taiwan. He was a baseball pitcher and later coach.

Identity 
Height: 5' 10"
Weight: 175 lb

Career

Playing career 
Shin-Ming Tan was the first player from Taiwan to play in Organized Baseball. Tan served in the Taiwan Air Force. During that time, he was with the Taiwan national team for the 1969 Asian Championship, 1971 Asian Championship, 1972 Amateur World Series, 1973 Asian Championship, 1973 Amateur World Series and 1973 Intercontinental Cup. In the 1972 Amateur World Series, he made the All-Star team as the best right-handed pitcher. He led that Series in strikeouts (53) and innings (51 1/3). Tan signed with the Taiheiyo Club Lions of the Pacific League. They shipped him out to the Fresno Giants. He pitched 23 games, 9 of them starts (5 complete games), posting a 8–4 record with 2 saves. He allowed 87 hits and 22 walks in 73 innings while striking out 53 and posting a 4.68 ERA. As the California League had recently instituted a Designated Hitter rule, he did not bat. After the season, the San Francisco Giants signed him, but he never again pitched in their farm system. He was the first Taiwan native to sign with an MLB team, predating Chin-Feng Chen by 26 years. Tan returned to Taiwan and pitched in amateur leagues as there was no professional baseball yet in his homeland. He played in the 1976 Amateur World Series.

Coaching career 
Tan later coached for the Chinese Cultural University and the Brother Hotels. In the 1986 Baseball World Cup, he coached for Taiwan and he managed Taiwan in the 1988 Haarlem Baseball Week. From 1991 to 1993, Tan was manager of the Mercuries Tigers of the Chinese Professional Baseball League, guiding them to a 104–147 record. He was briefly a visiting coach in the Korea Baseball Organization, working with the Lotte Giants. Tan threw a knuckleball, fastball and curveball.

Sources
 1975 Baseball Guide * A History of Cuban Baseball by Peter Bjarkman (1972 AWS stats) 

Living people
People from Chiayi County
Taiwanese expatriate baseball players in the United States
1950 births
Fresno Giants players
Taiwanese baseball players
Baseball pitchers
Mercuries Tigers managers